Josefina Cornejo Martínez is a Mexican retired Paralympic athlete that won 14 medals at the Summer Paralympics. She represented Mexico in the 1976 Summer Paralympics, where she won four gold and two silver medals, and in the 1980 Summer Paralympics, where she won four gold, three silver, and one bronze medals. She competed in parathletism, paraswimming and para table tennis events. She was included in Hall of Fame of the Mexican Sports Confederation in 1983.

References

External links
 Profile at Paralympic.com

Athletes (track and field) at the 1976 Summer Paralympics
Athletes (track and field) at the 1980 Summer Paralympics
Living people
Female club throwers
Medalists at the 1976 Summer Paralympics
Medalists at the 1980 Summer Paralympics
Mexican female discus throwers
Mexican female shot putters
Mexican female swimmers
Mexican female table tennis players
Mexican female wheelchair racers
Paralympic athletes of Mexico
Paralympic discus throwers
Paralympic shot putters
Paralympic swimmers of Mexico
Paralympic bronze medalists for Mexico
Paralympic gold medalists for Mexico
Paralympic silver medalists for Mexico
Paralympic medalists in athletics (track and field)
Paralympic medalists in swimming
Paralympic medalists in table tennis
Paralympic table tennis players of Mexico
Swimmers at the 1976 Summer Paralympics
Swimmers at the 1980 Summer Paralympics
Table tennis players at the 1980 Summer Paralympics
Wheelchair discus throwers
Wheelchair shot putters
Place of birth missing (living people)
Year of birth missing (living people)
21st-century Mexican women
20th-century Mexican women